Giacomo Eremiti (17th century) was an Italian painter of landscapes, active in Rome. He painted the landscapes in the Birth of Adonis and the Rape of Adonis now in the Palazzo Doria Pamphili in Rome, and in the figures were added by Nicolas Poussin.

References

Year of birth unknown
Year of death unknown
17th-century Italian painters
Italian male painters
Italian Baroque painters
Italian landscape painters